Brazilian National Badminton Championships are held since the year 1991. In the year 1994 there was an international participation in the championships. International championships of Brazil are held since 1984.

Past winners

References
badminton.org.br

Badminton tournaments in Brazil
National badminton championships
Recurring sporting events established in 1991
Brazil sport-related lists
Badminton